Isaäc Jan Hendrik Isbrücker (born 1944) is a retired Dutch ichthyologist who specialised in the scientific classification of South American catfish (Loricarioidea).

Life and work 
Between 1960 and 1985 Isbrücker was a keeper of the aquarium in the Amsterdam Zoo. He then became responsible for fish collection of the Zoological Museum in Amsterdam, which was transferred to the Naturalis Centre in Leiden in 2011. Between 1969 and 2006 Isbrücker appeared of author or co-author of more than 80 publications, in which he described roughly a dozen new fish species, including the genus Hypancistrus. His work focuses on the taxonomy of the armored catfish.

Species named in his honour include:
 a cichlid Crenicichla isbrueckeri, Ploeg, 1991)
 an armored catfish (Hypostomus isbrueckeri, R. E. dos Reis, C. Weber & L. R. Malabarba, 1990
 a catfish (Corydoras isbrueckeri, Knaack, 2004)

See also
:Category:Taxa named by Isaäc J. H. Isbrücker

References 

1944 births
Living people
Dutch ichthyologists